Zachariah Charbonnet (born January 8, 2001) is an American football running back. He played college football for the Michigan Wolverines before transferring to UCLA Bruins in 2021. He was a two-time all-conference selection in the Pac-12 with the Bruins, earning first-team All-American honors as a senior in 2022.

Early years
Charbonnet was born in 2001 and grew up in Camarillo, California. His mother, Seda, is part Cambodian, Chinese and French and immigrated to the United States from France. His father, Mark, is African-American. Charbonnet is also of Louisiana African-American/Creole descent. Charbonnet did not begin playing football until the seventh grade. He recalled: "As soon as I touched the field, I fell in love with the sport."

He attended Oaks Christian School in Westlake Village, California, where he tallied 4,741 rushing yards and 62 total touchdowns.  He had 2,049 yards and 23 touchdowns as a junior. Former Oaks Christian coach Jim Benkert described Charbonnet as follows: "He's the best there is. He's got all the measurements and loves the game. He's one of those guys who can take over a game on either side of the ball and is probably the best running back in the country. He competes at a high level on every play. You can't coach that kind of stuff. He's a throwback player. He does his job and doesn't care about statistics. All he cares about is winning."

Recruiting
Charbonnet was rated among the top running back prospects in the country – ranked No. 3 by 247Sports.com, No. 4 by Rivals.com, and No. 6 by ESPN.com. He was also invited to play in the 2019 Under Armour All-America Game. On June 23, 2018, prior to the start of his senior year in high school, Charbonnet committed to play college football at the University of Michigan.

College career

Michigan 
Shortly after his enrollment at Michigan in January 2019, Charbonnet underwent knee surgery. He missed spring practice while recuperating, but was recovered by late summer.

Charbonnet started at running back in Michigan's 2019 season opener. He totaled 99 yards, 90 rushing yards on eight carries and nine receiving yards on two receptions.

On September 7, against Army, Charbonnet had his first 100-yard rushing game, and recorded three touchdowns. On October 12, against Illinois, Charbonnet had 108 rushing yards in the first half. He finished the game with 116 yards on 18 carries, and a touchdown. On November 2, against Maryland, Charbonnet recorded two touchdowns, setting a Michigan program record for the most touchdowns by a freshman with 11.

Charbonnet concluded the 2019 season with 726 rushing yards and 11 touchdowns (a Michigan freshman record) on 149 carries.

During the 2020 season, Charbonnet totaled 124 yards and one touchdown on 19 carries. In January 2021, Charbonnet announced his intent to transfer and entered the NCAA transfer portal.

UCLA 

On January 30, 2021, Charbonnet announced his intention to transfer to the University of California, Los Angeles. During the 2021 season, he and Brittain Brown shared the Bruins' rushing duties in a two-back system. With Brown out injured against USC, Charbonnet had season highs of 28 carries and 167 yards, while surpassing the 1,000-yard milestone for the season. Pac-12 coaches voted Charbonnet second-team all-conference, and the Associated Press named him the conference's newcomer of the year. He finished with 1,137 yards rushing and 13 touchdowns, finishing second in the conference in rushing yards per game with 94.8, behind B. J. Baylor of Oregon State.

On January 14, 2022, Charbonnet announced that he would return to UCLA in 2022 for his senior season. On October 8, he  rushed for a career-high 198 yards and a touchdown on 22 carries in a 42–32 win over No. 11 Utah. He tied his career-high against with 198 yards rushing in a win against Stanford, rushing for three touchdowns while also leading the team five receptions for 61 yards. Charbonnet finished the season with 1,359 yards rushing and 14 touchdowns, while catching 37 passes for 321 yards. He was named a first-team All-American as an all-purpose specialist by the Football Writers Association of America. He led the nation with 168 all-purpose yards per game. His 1,680 all-purpose yards were the eighth-highest single-season total in UCLA history. After the season, Charbonnet declared for the 2023 NFL Draft, forgoing his remaining year of eligiblity, which was granted by the NCAA for all players on a roster during the 2020 season impacted by the COVID-19 pandemic.

College statistics

References

External links
 UCLA Bruins profile
 Michigan Wolverines profile

2001 births
Living people
African-American players of American football
People from Camarillo, California
Players of American football from California
Sportspeople from Ventura County, California
American football running backs
Michigan Wolverines football players
UCLA Bruins football players
21st-century African-American sportspeople